Bitter and Sweet is the seventh studio album by Japanese singer Akina Nakamori. It was released on 3 April 1985 under the Warner Pioneer label. The album includes a renewed version of the No. 1 single "Kazari ja Nai no yo Namida wa".

Background
Bitter and Sweet came half a year after her previous studio album, "Possibility".

The music production team consisted of various semi-popular artists of the time frame, such as EPO, Toshiki Kadomatsu, Yousui Inoue, Akira Jimbo, Minako Yoshida and Aska (from the duo Chage and Aska).

Yokan took on a new arrangement and was included on the mini studio album My Best Thanks. The original version's final melody slowly fades away while in the mini studio version includes the sound of noise to follow final track from the mini album. In 1995 it was arranged for a lone piano, recorded for Nakamori's true album akina 95 best, in which she essentially covered herself.

With this album, Nakamori changes not just her visual appearance, but also her musical style from the stereotypical idol-Kayōkyoku into Pop and Synth-pop. It's also her final effort to be produced by Yuuzou Shimada.

Promotion

Single
It consists of one previously released single, Kazari ja Nai no yo Namida wa. The single has received the musical award in the 14th FNS Music Festival in 1984. The album version has subtitle New Re-mix version and includes renewed arrangement. The intro begins with the solo of bass guitar, while the original version starts with the whole instrumental session part. The original version of Kazarijanai yo Namida wa was included in the second compilation album "Best" in 1986.

On 1 May 1985, on Nakamori's third debut anniversary was released original demo of the Meu Amore, Akaitori ga Nigeta as a A-side track and album track Babylon was recorded as a B-side song. Babylon has received a new remix version with the extension of two minutes, in the compare with the original.

Stage performances
On the Fuji TV music television program Yoru no Hit Studio, she performed original version of "Kazari ja Nai no yo Namida wa" and Koiito to Iru Jikan.

On NHK music television program Young Studio 101, she performed together at once Dreaming and Yokan.

Babylon, So Long, Yokan, Romantic na Yoru dawa, Koibito to Iru Jikan, Unsteady Love, April Stars and Dreaming were performed in Nakamori's live tour Bitter and Sweet in 1985.

Nakamori reprised the performance of Babylon in the live tour A Hundred Days in 1987 and Femme Fatale in 1988.

Among of all album tracks, the Yokan has been performed the most times: in 1993, she performed it in one-night special live event Utahime Live at Parco Threatre, in 1995 special live true akina best 1995, she performed version with the piano arrangement, five years later in 2000 she performed it in live tour 21 Seiki he no Tabidachi and in 2003 it was in her live tour I hope so.

Charting performance
The album reached number 1 on the Oricon Album Weekly Charts for two consecutive weeks. LP Record version charted 22 weeks, Cassette tape version debuted on number 1 as well and charted 24 weeks and sold over 573,700 copies. The album remained at number 9 on the Oricon Album Yearly Charts in 1985.

Track listing

Notes:
 All English titles are stylized in all uppercase.

Covers
Japanese singer Aska from rock band Chage and Aska, covered Yokan in his second solo album Scene II in 1988.

Japanese composer and singer, Toshiki Kadomatsu covered "Unsteady Love" on his studio album Gentle Sex in 2000.

References

1985 albums
Japanese-language albums
Akina Nakamori albums
Warner Music Japan albums